Jason Tovey (born 28 April 1989) is a retired Welsh rugby union player who played at fly-half. He has represented the Wales under-20.

Club career

Newport RFC
Tovey played junior and colts rugby for Risca RFC. Usually a fullback or fly-half, Tovey spent two years with the Dragons Academy, first playing at the age of 15 playing a full season at fullback for Newport RFC. At the age of seventeen and was then moved to fly-half.

Newport Gwent Dragons: 2008-2012
Tovey made his debut for Newport Gwent Dragons against the Ospreys in a Celtic League defeat on Friday 25 April 2008  On 22 February 2009 he became the first Dragons player to score a hat-trick of tries in an official match, scoring 23 of the 26 points in the win over Ulster at Rodney Parade.

In May 2010 Tovey was voted Young Player of the Year at the Welsh professional players awards.

Cardiff Blues: 2012-2013
On 23 March 2012, it was announced that Tovey would move to Cardiff Blues for the 2012–13 season.

Return to the Dragons: 2013-2016
Tovey rejoined Newport Gwent Dragons for the start of the 2013–14 season.

Edinburgh Rugby:2016-2018
In March 2016 Tovey joined Edinburgh Rugby on a 2-year deal.

Return to the Dragons: 2018–2019
Tovey rejoined the Dragons for a third spell for the 2018-2019 season. He was released at the end of the season.

Second stint with Cardiff: 2019–2022
Tovey once again joined Cardiff Rugby in 2019, following his release from the Dragons. He retired at the end of the 2021–2022 season.

International
Tovey was called up to the senior Wales squad for the tour of North America in 2009, though he was later cut from the squad and put on stand by. In June 2011 he was named the Wales national rugby union team 45-man training squad for the 2011 Rugby World Cup.

References

External links
Newport Gwent Dragons profile
Welsh Rugby Union profile
Bedwas RFC profile
Newport RFC profile

1989 births
Living people
Dragons RFC players
Rugby union players from Newport, Wales
Newport RFC players
Cardiff Rugby players
Welsh rugby union players
Cross Keys RFC players
Edinburgh Rugby players
Rugby union fly-halves